Qarah Mohammad (also Romanized as Qarah Moḩammad) is a village in Tabadkan Rural District, in the Central District of Mashhad County, Razavi Khorasan Province, Iran. At the 2006 census, its population was 40, in 10 families.

References 

Populated places in Mashhad County